Frederick Dewey Smith (September 14, 1948 – November 4, 1994), known professionally as Fred "Sonic" Smith, was an American guitarist, best known as a member of the influential and political Detroit rock band MC5. At age 31, he married and raised a family with poet and fellow rock musician Patti Smith. The couple collaborated musically, and raised two children together.

Career 
Smith was a guitarist with the MC5 and later went on to form Sonic's Rendezvous Band, which released one single, "City Slang", during Smith's lifetime. In 1988 he collaborated with Patti Smith on her  album Dream of Life.

In 2018, Smith was inducted into the West Virginia Music Hall of Fame alongside Hasil Adkins and Ann Magnuson.

Personal life 
Smith was born on Broad Branch in the Harts Creek area of Lincoln County, West Virginia. He was born in his family's kitchen during an electrical storm, delivered by his grandfather. Smith was first married to Sigrid Dobat. They had a baby who died of SIDS.

He and his band opened a show for singer and poet Patti Smith. Patti Smith's guitarist, Lenny Kaye, introduced Fred and Patti before the show. Fred was still married to Sigrid when he started an affair with Patti Smith. The two were married in 1980.

Together the Smiths had a son, Jackson (born 1982) and a daughter, Jesse (born 1987). Jackson, a guitarist, was married to Meg White (formerly of indie band The White Stripes). Jesse is a pianist. Both have performed on stage with their mother along with other members of the Patti Smith Group.

A resident of St. Clair Shores, Michigan (a Detroit suburb), Fred Smith died in Detroit in 1994. He had been in poor health for years and succumbed to heart failure.

Influence 
In 2003, Rolling Stone magazine ranked Smith #93 in its list of The 100 Greatest Guitarists of All Time.

Patti Smith has spoken of how Fred Smith encouraged her writing, crediting his influence on a number of the songs she released after his death, as well as the prose works she created during their time together in Michigan. He was the inspiration for her song "Frederick", a single from her 1979 album Wave. Her 1996 album Gone Again features several songs inspired by, co-written by, or in tribute to, her late husband.

The band Sonic Youth took its name from Smith's nickname.

Inducted into West Virginia Music Hall of Fame 2018. Award given by Lenny Kaye accepted by Patti Smith, Jesse Smith and Jackson Smith.

Musical equipment 
Guitars
Rickenbacker 450 with Gibson PAF pickups
Epiphone Crestwood
Mosrite Guitars
Gretsch Country Gentleman

Amplification
Marshall Amplifer
Fender Super Reverb

Notes

References

External links 
 
 
 

1948 births
1994 deaths
American punk rock guitarists
American rock songwriters
Burials at Elmwood Cemetery (Detroit)
MC5 members
Patti Smith Group members
Protopunk musicians
Guitarists from West Virginia
Rhythm guitarists
People from St. Clair Shores, Michigan
20th-century American musicians
American rock guitarists
American male guitarists
Guitarists from Michigan
20th-century American guitarists
Sonic's Rendezvous Band members
20th-century American male musicians